The International Association for Religious Freedom (IARF), formerly the International Association for Liberal Christianity and Religious Freedom, is a charitable organization that works for religious freedom around the world. It was founded in Boston, Massachusetts in 1900, and is the oldest international group that promotes dialogue between religions.

IARF has over 90 affiliated religious groups, spread over 20 countries in the world, with a wide range of faiths represented, including denominations of Hinduism, Buddhism, Jainism, Sikhism, Shinto, Taoism, Christianity, Judaism, and Islam.

In 1972, IARF was granted consultative status with the United Nations Economic and Social Council (ECOSOC). It was the catalyst for the formation of the  "Committee on Freedom of Religion or Belief" in 1989, which was granted formal status with ECOSOC in 1992.

See also
Religious tolerance
Religious intolerance

External links
Official website

Religion and politics
Human rights organizations based in the United States